Acanthogonatus mulchen is a mygalomorph spider of Chile, named after its type locality: Alto Caledonia, east of Mulchén, Region VIII (Bío Bío Region). It is recognised by the long, narrow sternum. It differs from A. tolhuaca in the spermathecae having a less pronounced notch and the glandular areas on each side joining in the middle.

Description
Female: total length ; cephalothorax length , width ; cephalic region length , width ; fovea width ; medial ocular quadrangle length , width ; labium length , width ; sternum length , width . Its cephalic region is wide but low, while its fovea s straight to procurved with recurved ends, containing no posterior notch. Its labium possesses 2 cuspules. A serrula is present as a small patch of teeth only on the anterior face of the lobe. Its sternal sigilla is deep and long. Chelicerae: rastellum is absent. The entire spider is a uniform blackish-reddish-brown colour, except for one lighter spot in front of the abdomen. Juveniles have a similar color, but lighter, with diagonal lines of pale dots on the dorsum of their abdomen.

Distribution
Only in its type locality. The burrow's mouth is funnel-like, with white silk extending so as to form a sort of collar.

References

External links

ADW entry

Pycnothelidae
Spiders of South America
Spiders described in 1995
Endemic fauna of Chile